Lars Thorlaksøn Aas (26 February 1879 – 24 February 1964) was a Norwegian épée and foil fencer. He competed in three events at the 1912 Summer Olympics.

References

External links
 

1879 births
1964 deaths
Norwegian male épée fencers
Olympic fencers of Norway
Fencers at the 1912 Summer Olympics
Sportspeople from Oslo
Norwegian male foil fencers
20th-century Norwegian people